The Berkeley Seismological Laboratory (BSL) is a research lab at the Department of Geology at the University of California, Berkeley. It was created from the Berkeley Seismographic Stations, a site on the Berkeley campus where Worldwide Standard Seismographic Network instruments were first deployed in 1959. Today, BSL's mission is to "support fundamental research into all aspects of earthquakes, solid earth processes, and their effects on society".

An experimental early warning system developed by BSL issued a warning 10 seconds before the 6.0 magnitude earthquake that hit the Napa region on August 24, 2014.  Such a warning system could potentially give people time to take cover in the event of a quake, preventing injuries caused by falling debris, automatically stopping trains or shutting off gas lines. The system, developed in conjunction with the United States Geological Survey (USGS), the California Institute of Technology and the University of Washington, will eventually cover the entire West Coast. The system would cost $80 million in funding to run for five years in California, or $120 million for the whole West Coast. In July 2015, USGS awarded $4 million in funding to the project partners to turn the current ShakeAlert prototype into a more robust system.

See also
 Andrew Lawson
 Harry O. Wood

References

External links
 History of the BSL

University of California, Berkeley
Seismological observatories, organisations and projects
Earthquake engineering